The Kentucky Wildcats football statistical leaders are individual statistical leaders of the Kentucky Wildcats football program in various categories, including passing, rushing, receiving, total offense, all-purpose yardage, defensive stats, kicking, and scoring. Within those areas, the lists identify single-game, single-season, and career leaders. The Wildcats represent the University of Kentucky (UK) in the NCAA Division I FBS Southeastern Conference.

Although Kentucky began competing in intercollegiate football in 1892, the school's official record book considers the "modern era" to have begun in 1946. Records from before this year are often incomplete and inconsistent, and they are generally not included in these lists. For example, Cecil Tuttle rushed for 6 touchdowns against Maryland in 1907, but complete records for the era are unavailable. Recent UK media guides include a dedicated page listing what the school calls "old-time records" from the pre-1946 era.

These lists are dominated by more recent players for several reasons:
 Since 1950, seasons have increased from 10 games to 11 and then 12 games in length.
 The NCAA didn't allow freshmen to play varsity football until 1972 (with the exception of the World War II years), allowing players to have four-year careers.
 Bowl games only began counting toward single-season and career statistics in 2002. The Wildcats have played in 11 bowl games since this decision and are assured of a 12th in 2022, giving many recent players an extra game to accumulate statistics.
 Due to COVID-19 issues, the NCAA ruled that the 2020 season would not count against the athletic eligibility of any football player, giving everyone who played in that season the opportunity for five years of eligibility instead of the normal four.

These lists are updated through the end of the 2022 regular season.

Passing

Passing yards

Passing touchdowns

Rushing

Rushing yards

Rushing touchdowns

Receiving

Receptions

Receiving yards

Receiving touchdowns

Total offense
Total offense is the sum of passing and rushing statistics. It does not include receiving or returns.

Total offense yards

Touchdowns responsible for
"Touchdowns responsible for" is the NCAA's official term for combined passing and rushing touchdowns.

All-purpose yardage
All-purpose yardage is the sum of all yards credited to a player who is in possession of the ball. It includes rushing, receiving, and returns, but does not include passing.

Kentucky did not list a record for single-game all-purpose yardage in its football media guide until the 2019 edition (only including the top two performances), and even then did not break down said performances by type of play, only listing the number of plays involved. While it fully lists career leaders, it only lists annual leaders and does not maintain a separate list of all-time season leaders. However, a review of the career statistics for players listed among all-time and annual leaders shows that no season produced two players who would have been in the top 10 for single-season all-purpose yardage.

Defense
Note: The original source for this article, the 2014 Kentucky Football Media Guide, does not list a full top 10 in the defensive categories. No edition from 2017 forward lists a full top 10 in these categories.

Interceptions

Tackles

Sacks

Kicking
The original source for this page, the 2014 Kentucky Football Media Guide, only lists a top 5 in field goal kicking lists, rather than a top 10. Statistics from later seasons have been incorporated into the 2014 lists.

Field goals made

Field goal percentage

Scoring
The 2019 media guide was the first to include a full top 10 for career points scored. Otherwise, UK continues to follow its recent practice of not listing a full top 10 in other scoring categories, instead listing anywhere from a top 3 to a top 5. Lists from the 2017 media guide have been updated to include statistics from subsequent seasons.

Points

Touchdowns
In official NCAA statistics, touchdown totals include touchdowns scored. Accordingly, these lists include rushing, receiving, and return touchdowns, but not passing touchdowns.

References

Lists of college football statistical leaders by team